The 2017 NCAA Division I men's basketball tournament involved 68 teams playing in a single-elimination tournament to determine the men's National Collegiate Athletic Association (NCAA) Division I college basketball national champion for the 2016–17 season. The 79th edition of the tournament began on March 14, 2017, and concluded with the championship game on April 3 at University of Phoenix Stadium in Glendale, Arizona. The championship game was the first to be contested in a Western state since 1995 when Seattle was the host of the Final Four.

In the Final Four, North Carolina beat Oregon (making their first Final Four appearance since the inaugural tournament in 1939) while Gonzaga defeated South Carolina (both making their first ever Final Four appearance). North Carolina then defeated Gonzaga 71–65 to win their 6th national championship, and 3rd under Roy Williams.

Tournament procedures

A total of 68 teams entered the 2017 tournament, with all 32 conference tournament winners receiving an automatic bid. The Ivy League, which previously granted its automatic tournament bid to its regular season champion, hosted a postseason tournament to determine a conference champion for the first time. In previous years, had the Ivy League had two schools tied for first in the standings, a one-game playoff (or series as was the case in the 2002 season) determined the automatic bid. On March 10, 2016, the Ivy League's council of presidents approved a four-team tournament where the top four teams in the regular season would play on March 11 and 12 at Philadelphia's Palestra.

The remaining 36 teams received "at-large" bids which are extended by the NCAA Selection Committee. On January 24, 2016, the NCAA announced that the Selection Committee would, for the first time, unveil in-season rankings of the top four teams in each division on February 11, 2017.

Eight teams—the four lowest-seeded automatic qualifiers and the four lowest-seeded at-large teams—played in the First Four (the successor to what had been known as "play-in games" through the 2010 tournament). The winners of these games advanced to the main draw of the tournament.

The Selection Committee also seeded the entire field from 1 to 68.

The committee's selections resulted in two historic milestones. The Northwestern Wildcats of the Big Ten Conference made their first-ever NCAA Tournament in school history, officially becoming the last "power conference" school to make the tournament. (This fact is ironic considering that Northwestern hosted the first-ever NCAA Tournament in 1939). The Wildcats' First round opponent, the Vanderbilt Commodores of the Southeastern Conference, also made history: with a record of 19–15, they set the mark for the most ever losses for an at-large team in tournament history.

Four conference champions also made their first NCAA appearances: North Dakota (Big Sky Conference), UC Davis (Big West Conference), Jacksonville State (Ohio Valley Conference), and first-year Division I school Northern Kentucky (Horizon League).

Schedule and venues

The following sites were selected to host each round of the 2017 tournament

First Four
March 14 and 15
University of Dayton Arena, Dayton, Ohio (Host: University of Dayton)

First and Second Rounds
March 16 and 18
 Amway Center, Orlando, Florida (Hosts: University of Central Florida and Stetson University)
 Bradley Center, Milwaukee (Host: Marquette University)
 KeyBank Center, Buffalo, New York (Host: Metro Atlantic Athletic Conference, Niagara University and Canisius College)
 Vivint Arena, Salt Lake City (Host: University of Utah)
March 17 and 19
 Bankers Life Fieldhouse, Indianapolis (Hosts: Horizon League and IUPUI)
 BOK Center, Tulsa, Oklahoma (Host: University of Tulsa) 
 Bon Secours Wellness Arena, Greenville, South Carolina, (Hosts: Southern Conference and Furman University)
 Golden 1 Center, Sacramento, California (Host: California State University, Sacramento)

Regional semifinals and Finals (Sweet Sixteen and Elite Eight)
March 23 and 25
Midwest Regional, Sprint Center, Kansas City, Missouri (Host: Big 12 Conference)
West Regional, SAP Center, San Jose, California (Host: Pac-12 Conference)
March 24 and 26
East Regional, Madison Square Garden, New York City (Hosts: St. John's University and Big East Conference)
South Regional, FedExForum, Memphis, Tennessee (Host: University of Memphis)

National semifinals and championship (Final Four and championship)
April 1 and 3
University of Phoenix Stadium, Glendale, Arizona (Host: Arizona State University)

Qualification and selection

Eight teams, out of 351 in Division I, were ineligible to participate in the 2017 tournament due to failing to meet APR requirements, self-imposed postseason bans, or reclassification from a lower division. Hawaii had previously been banned from entering the tournament as a penalty for infractions, but the NCAA later reversed its ban.

Automatic qualifiers
The following 32 teams were automatic qualifiers for the 2017 NCAA field by virtue of winning their conference's automatic bid.

Notes

Tournament seeds

*See First Four

Bracket
All times are listed as Eastern Daylight Time (UTC−4)
* – Denotes overtime period

First Four – Dayton, Ohio
The First Four games involved eight teams: the four overall lowest-ranked teams, and the four lowest-ranked at-large teams.

Game Summaries

East Regional – New York City, New York

East Regional First round

East Regional Final

East Regional all tournament team
 Sindarius Thornwell (Sr, South Carolina) – East Regional most outstanding player
 P. J. Dozier (So, South Carolina)
 KeVaughn Allen (So, Florida)
 Chris Chiozza (Jr, Florida)
 Nigel Hayes (Sr, Wisconsin)

West Regional – San Jose, California

West Regional First round

West Regional Final

West Regional all tournament team
 Johnathan Williams (Jr, Gonzaga) – West Regional most outstanding player
 Trevon Bluiett (Jr, Xavier)
 J. P. Macura (Jr, Xavier)
 Jordan Mathews (Sr, Gonzaga)
 Nigel Williams-Goss (Jr, Gonzaga)

Midwest Regional – Kansas City, Missouri

Midwest Regional First round

Midwest Regional Final

Midwest Regional all tournament team
 Jordan Bell (Jr., Oregon) – Midwest Regional most outstanding player
 Frank Mason III (Sr, Kansas)
 Dillon Brooks (Jr, Oregon)
 Tyler Dorsey (So., Oregon)
 Josh Jackson (Fr, Kansas)

South Regional – Memphis, Tennessee

South Regional Final

South Regional all tournament team
 Luke Maye (So., North Carolina) – South Regional most outstanding player
 De'Aaron Fox (Fr, Kentucky)
 Isaac Humphries (So., Kentucky)
 Joel Berry II (Jr, North Carolina)
 Justin Jackson (Jr, North Carolina)

Final Four

During the Final Four round, regardless of the seeds of the participating teams, the champion of the top overall top seed's region (Villanova's East Region) plays against the champion of the fourth-ranked top seed's region (Gonzaga's West Region), and the champion of the second overall top seed's region (Kansas's Midwest Region) plays against the champion of the third-ranked top seed's region (North Carolina's South Region).

University of Phoenix Stadium – Glendale, Arizona

Final Four

National Championship

Final Four all-tournament team
 Joel Berry II (Jr, North Carolina) – Final Four Most Outstanding Player
 Nigel Williams-Goss (Jr, Gonzaga)
 Justin Jackson (Jr, North Carolina)
 Kennedy Meeks (Sr, North Carolina)
 Zach Collins (Fr, Gonzaga)

Game summaries and tournament notes

Upsets
Per the NCAA, "Upsets are defined as when the winner of the game was seeded five or more places lower than the team it defeated." The 2017 tournament saw a total of 9 upsets; 4 of them were in the first round, 4 of them were in the second round, and one of them in the Sweet Sixteen.

Record by conference

The R64, R32, S16, E8, F4, CG, and NC columns indicate how many teams from each conference were in the round of 64 (first round), round of 32 (second round), Sweet 16, Elite Eight, Final Four, championship game, and national champion, respectively.
The "Record" column includes wins in the First Four for the Big 12, Big West, NEC, and Pac-12 conferences and losses in the First Four for the ACC and Big East conferences.
The MEAC and Southland each had one representative, both eliminated in the First Four with a record of 0–1.
The America East, Atlantic Sun, Big Sky, Big South, CAA, Horizon, Ivy League, MAAC, MAC, Mountain West, Ohio Valley, Patriot, Southern, Summit, Sun Belt, SWAC, and WAC conferences each had one representative, eliminated in the first round with a record of 0–1.

Media coverage

Television
CBS Sports and Turner Sports held joint U.S. television broadcast rights to the Tournament under the NCAA March Madness brand. As part of a cycle beginning in 2016, CBS held rights to the Final Four and championship game. As CBS did not want its audience to be diffused across multiple outlets, there were no localized "Team Stream" telecasts of the Final Four or championship games on Turner channels as in previous years.

Following criticism of the two-hour format of the 2016 edition, the Selection Sunday broadcast was shortened to 90 minutes. CBS Sports executive Harold Bryant promised that the unveiling of the bracket would be conducted in an "efficient" manner, and leave more time to discuss and preview the tournament.

 First Four – TruTV
 First and Second rounds – CBS, TBS, TNT, and TruTV
 Regional semifinals and Finals (Sweet Sixteen and Elite Eight) – CBS and TBS
 National semifinals (Final Four) and championship – CBS

Studio hosts
 Greg Gumbel (New York City and Glendale) – First round, second round, Regionals, Final Four and National Championship Game
 Ernie Johnson Jr. (New York City, Atlanta, and Glendale) – First round, second round, Regional Semi-Finals, Final Four and National Championship Game
 Casey Stern (Atlanta) – First Four, first round and Second Round
 Adam Zucker (Glendale) – Final Four

Studio analysts
 Charles Barkley (New York City and Glendale) – First round, second round, Regionals, Final Four and National Championship Game
 Seth Davis (Atlanta and Glendale) – First Four, first round, second round, Regional Semi-Finals, Final Four and National Championship Game
 Brendan Haywood (Atlanta and Glendale) – First Four, first round, second round, Regional Semi-Finals, and Final Four
 Clark Kellogg (New York City and Glendale) – First round, second round, Regionals, Final Four and National Championship Game
 Jimmy Patsos (Atlanta) – Second Round
 Bruce Pearl (Atlanta) – First round
 Jon Rothstein (Glendale) - Final Four
 Kenny Smith (New York City and Glendale) – First round, second round, Regionals, Final Four and National Championship Game
 Steve Smith (Glendale) – Final Four
 Wally Szczerbiak (New York City,  Atlanta, and Glendale) – First Four, second round, and Final Four
 Buzz Williams (Atlanta) – Regional Semi-Finals
 Jay Wright (Glendale) – Final Four

Commentary teams
 Jim Nantz/Bill Raftery/Grant Hill/Tracy Wolfson – First and Second Rounds at Indianapolis, Indiana; South Regional at Memphis, Tennessee; Final Four and National Championship at Glendale, Arizona
 Brian Anderson/Chris Webber or Clark Kellogg/Lewis Johnson – First Four at Dayton, Ohio (Tuesday); First and Second Rounds at Greenville, South Carolina; West Regional at San Jose, California
 Kellogg called the First Four (Tuesday) with Webber doing the First, Second and Regionals.
 Verne Lundquist/Jim Spanarkel/Allie LaForce – First and Second Rounds at Buffalo, New York; East Regional at New York City, New York
 Kevin Harlan/Reggie Miller/Dan Bonner/Dana Jacobson – First and Second Rounds at Tulsa, Oklahoma; Midwest Regional at Kansas City, Missouri
 Ian Eagle/Steve Lavin/Evan Washburn – First and Second Rounds at Orlando, Florida
 Spero Dedes/Steve Smith/Len Elmore/Rosalyn Gold-Onwude – First Four at Dayton, Ohio (Wednesday); First and Second Rounds at Sacramento, California
 Andrew Catalon/Steve Lappas/Jamie Erdahl – First and Second Rounds at Salt Lake City, Utah
 Carter Blackburn/Mike Gminski/Debbie Antonelli/Lisa Byington – First and Second Rounds at Milwaukee, Wisconsin

Radio
Westwood One had exclusive radio rights to the entire tournament. For the first time in the history of the tournament, broadcasts of the Final Four and championship game were available in Spanish.

First Four
Ted Emrich and Austin Croshere – at Dayton, Ohio

First and Second rounds
Scott Graham and Donny Marshall – Buffalo, New York
Brandon Gaudin and Kelly Tripucka – Milwaukee, Wisconsin
Tom McCarthy and Will Perdue – Orlando, Florida
Kevin Kugler and Dan Dickau – Salt Lake City, Utah
John Sadak and Eric Montross/John Thompson – Greenville, South Carolina (Montross – Friday night; Thompson – Friday Afternoon & Sunday)
Chris Carrino and Jim Jackson – Indianapolis, Indiana
Craig Way and P. J. Carlesimo – Tulsa, Oklahoma
Jason Benetti and Mike Montgomery – Sacramento, California

Regionals
Ian Eagle and Donny Marshall – East Regional at New York City, New York
Tom McCarthy and Will Purdue – Midwest Regional at Kansas City, Missouri
Gary Cohen and P. J. Carlesimo – South Regional at Memphis, Tennessee
Kevin Kugler and Jim Jackson – West Regional at San Jose, California

Final Four
Kevin Kugler, Clark Kellogg, and Jim Gray – Glendale, Arizona

Internet

Video
Live video of games was available for streaming through the following means:
 NCAA March Madness Live (website and app, no CBS games on digital media players; access to games on Turner channels requires TV Everywhere authentication through provider)
 CBS All Access (only CBS games, service subscription required)
 CBS Sports website and app (only CBS games)
 Bleacher Report website and Team Stream app (only Turner games, access requires subscription)
 Watch TBS website and app (only TBS games, requires TV Everywhere authentication)
 Watch TNT website and app (only TNT games, requires TV Everywhere authentication)
 Watch truTV website and app (only truTV games, requires TV Everywhere authentication)
 Websites and apps of cable, satellite, and OTT providers of CBS & Turner (access requires subscription)

Audio
Live audio of games was available for streaming through the following means:
 NCAA March Madness Live (website and app)
 Westwood One Sports website
 TuneIn (website and app)
 Websites and apps of Westwood One Sports affiliates

See also
 2017 NCAA Division II men's basketball tournament
 2017 NCAA Division III men's basketball tournament
 2017 NCAA Division I women's basketball tournament
 2017 NCAA Division II women's basketball tournament
 2017 NCAA Division III women's basketball tournament
 2017 National Invitation Tournament
 2017 Women's National Invitation Tournament
 2017 NAIA Division I men's basketball tournament
 2017 NAIA Division II men's basketball tournament
 2017 NAIA Division I women's basketball tournament
 2017 NAIA Division II women's basketball tournament
 2017 College Basketball Invitational
 2017 CollegeInsider.com Postseason Tournament

Notes

References

External links
 

NCAA tournament
NCAA Division I men's basketball tournament
College basketball tournaments in Arizona
2017 in sports in Arizona
Sports in Glendale, Arizona
Events in Glendale, Arizona
Sports competitions in Maricopa County, Arizona